Jaguar R may refer to:

 Jaguar R and SVR models — Jaguar's high-performance division of production cars.

List of Jaguar R-models
Jaguar R-Type Formula 1 race cars from Jaguar Racing

 Jaguar R1 — 2000 Formula 1 season 
 Jaguar R2 — 2001 Formula 1 season 
 Jaguar R3 — 2002 Formula 1 season 
 Jaguar R4 — 2003 Formula 1 season 
 Jaguar R5 — 2004 Formula 1 season

Jaguar concept cars from Jaguar Cars
 Jaguar R-Coupe — 2001
 Jaguar R-D6 — 2003

See also
 Jaguar (disambiguation)
 R (disambiguation)

R